The Anatomist may refer to:

Film and theatre
 The Anatomist, a 1696 play by Edward Ravenscroft 
Several fictionalized accounts of the Burke and Hare murders, including:
A 1930 play by James Bridie, and subsequent 1937 television treatment
A 1939 film adaptation of Bridie's play, starring Bruce Seton
A 1948 London stage play starring Alastair Sim
A 1956 British television film starring Alistair Sim, released theatrically in the US in 1961
The Anatomist by James Bridie, a 1980 film treatment directed by Julian Amyes

Literature
The Anatomist (novel), a 1996 novel by Federico Andahazi
The Anatomist (2008 book), by Bill Hayes, about Gray's Anatomy